Peptoniphilus senegalensis is a Gram-positive, non-endospore-forming and non-motile bacterium from the genus of Peptoniphilus which has been isolated from human feces from Dielmo in Senegal.

References 

Bacteria described in 2016
Eubacteriales